Martina Navratilova and Pam Shriver were the defending champions but only Navratilova competed that year with Iwona Kuczyńska.

Kuczynska and Navratilova won in the final 6–1, 6–4 against Raffaella Reggi and Elna Reinach.

Seeds
Champion seeds are indicated in bold text while text in italics indicates the round in which those seeds were eliminated.

 Jana Novotná /  Catherine Suire (first round)
 Catarina Lindqvist /  Tine Scheuer-Larsen (first round)
 Nathalie Herreman /  Catherine Tanvier (semifinals)
 Isabelle Demongeot /  Nathalie Tauziat (semifinals)

Draw

External links
 ITF tournament edition details

Porsche Tennis Grand Prix
1988 WTA Tour